Addis Zemen (Amharic "New Era"; also known as Addis Abreham) is a town in northern-central Ethiopia. It is the administrative center of Kemekem woreda.

The 1994 census reported this town had a total population of 14,342 of whom 6,443 were males and 7,899 were females.

Nearby landmarks include Mount Asiba and the monastery of St. Claudius, who lived during the reign of Emperor Gelawdeos. The monastery possesses some impressive wall paintings and several illuminated manuscripts dating to the 18th century. 

The mother of Emperor Sarsa Dengel took refuge at Addis Zemen.

Notes 

Populated places in the Amhara Region